Clute station is a railway station in the town of Cochrane, Ontario, Canada. It is named for the nearby settlement of Clute, and is on the Ontario Northland's Polar Bear Express. As a flag stop, it has no station structure. It is located east of Clute and south of Glackmeyer Blount Boundary Line.

External links
Polar Bear Express Service Map

Ontario Northland Railway stations
Railway stations in Cochrane District